Ayekpam Tomba Meetei is an Indian social worker, works for the welfare of orphans and economically poor people of Manipur. He has also contributed towards the revival of the Meetei Mayek script. The Government of India honored him in 2010, with the fourth highest civilian award of Padma Shri.

References

Living people
Recipients of the Padma Shri in social work
People from Imphal
Social workers
Social workers from Manipur
Year of birth missing (living people)